Xiangtan University (XTU) is a national key university located in Xiangtan, Hunan, China. It was founded in 1958 and is currently organized into 23 schools and departments.

As of 2022, the Best Chinese Universities Ranking, also known as the "Shanghai Ranking", placed the university the best in Xiangtan and 4th in Hunan.

History 
In 1958, under the proposal of the Supreme leader of China Mao Zedong, Xiangtan University was founded in Xiangtan County of Hunan Province, where Mao was born and grew up. The University ceased to run by the order of the provincial authority in 1959, but then recovered its function in 1974. The university became a Double First Class University in 2022.

Rankings

General Rankings 
As of 2022, the Best Chinese Universities Ranking, also known as the "Shanghai Ranking", placed the university the best in Xiangtan and 4th in Hunan. In 2017, Times Higher Education ranked the university top 800-1000 in the world. In 2021, Xiangtan University was ranked in the top 1000 universities in the world by several international rankings including the Times Higher Education, the U.S. News & World Report and the Center for World University Rankings (CWUR).

Research and Subject Rankings 
The 2021 CWTS Leiden Ranking ranked Xiangtan University at 635th in the world based on their publications for the period 2016–2019. The Nature Index 2021 by Nature Research ranked Xiangtan University among the top 500 leading research institutions globally for the high quality of research publications in natural science.

References

External links

 
Xiangtan
Educational institutions established in 1958
1958 establishments in China